My Promise is the debut album by the German-based trio No Mercy, released in 1996. It is the group's most successful album and contains all of their international hits: "Missing", "Where Do You Go", "When I Die", "Please Don't Go" and "Kiss You All Over".

The album was released in North America as No Mercy, which had a different cover as well as a different track listing.

Critical reception
from Billboard viewed the album as "an engaging set", noting that producer Frank Farian "keeps the set relentlessly bright and rife with fluttering flamenco guitars—save for the brooding ballad "When I Die", which allows singer Marty Cintron to fully flex his boyish, star-powered charm." He added, "Knee-deep with potential hits, the album's next logical single should be either the giddy rendition of Exile's "Kiss You All Over" or the spirited "Don't Make Me Live Without You"." British magazine Music Week wrote, "Lively Latin numbers and luscious love songs, most underpinned by flamenco guitar, are assembled for a pleasing debut."

Track listing

My Promise

No Mercy

Charts

Weekly charts

Year-end charts

Certifications

References

1996 debut albums
No Mercy (pop band) albums
Albums produced by Frank Farian